Eva Pandora Baldursdóttir (born October 8, 1990) is a member of the Alþingi for the Pirate Party of Iceland.

Early life and education
Baldursdóttir earned a B.A. in Accounting and Business/Management from Háskóli Íslands in 2013, and a graduate-level additional diploma in public administration in 2017. Prior to entering politics, Baldursdóttir work in the travel industry, including for Icelandair.

Political career
Baldursdóttir has represented the Northwest Constituency since 2016.

She is presently a member of the Constitutional and Supervisory Committee, and previously served on the Industrial Affairs and Economic Affairs Committees.

External links
 Official website

References

Eva Pandora Baldursdottir
Eva Pandora Baldursdottir
1990 births
Eva Pandora Baldursdottir
Living people